Paul Schudel (born July 2, 1944) is a former American football player and coach.  He served as the head football coach at Ball State University from 1985 to 1994 and at Central Connecticut State University from 2001 to 2003, compiling a career college football record of 70–69–4.

Coaching career
Schudel was the twelfth head football coach at Ball State University, in Muncie, Indiana, serving for ten seasons, from 1985 to 1994, and compiling a record of 60–48–4.

Schudel was the tenth head football coach at Central Connecticut State University, in New Britain, Connecticut, serving for three seasons, from 2001 to 2003, and compiling a record of 10–21.

Head coaching record

References

1944 births
Living people
American football tackles
Ball State Cardinals football coaches
Central Connecticut Blue Devils football coaches
Colorado State Rams football coaches
Illinois Fighting Illini football coaches
Miami RedHawks football coaches
Miami RedHawks football players
Michigan Wolverines football coaches
New Hampshire Wildcats football coaches
Syracuse Orange football coaches
William & Mary Tribe football coaches
Virginia Cavaliers football coaches
People from Swanton, Ohio
American expatriate sportspeople in France